Rajya Sabha elections were held in 1952, to elect members of the Council of States (the Rajya Sabha), Indian Parliament's upper chamber.

Elections

Elections were held in 1952 to elect members from various states of Independent India. Dr. S Radhakrishnan was the First Chairman of the Rajya Sabha, also the First Vice President of the Nation.
The list is incomplete.

Members elected
The members are elected in the elections held in 1952. As per the Fourth Schedule to the Constitution of India, the Rajya Sabha was first constituted 3 April 1952. and consist of 216 members of which 12 members were to be nominated by the President and the remaining 204 elected to represent the States.As per President Order known as the Council of States (Term of Office of Members) Order, 1952 for curtailing the term of office of some of the members, then chosen in order that as nearly as one-third of the members holding seats of each class would retire in every second year. The term of office of a member expires on 2 April 1958; 2 April 1956 and 2 April 1954 and accordingly members would be placed in the first, second or third category.

Members with term 1952-54
The following members are retired before the elections held in 1954. They are members for the term 1952 ||54. Some members did not complete the term in case of the resignation or death before the term ending in 1954. In such cases the bye-elections were held.

State - Member - Party

Members with term 1952-56
The following members are retired before the elections held in 1956. They are members for the term 1952-56. Some members did not complete the term in case of the resignation or death before the term ending in 1956. In such cases the bye-elections were held.

State - Member - Party

Members with term 1952-58
The following members are retired before the elections held in 1958. They are members for the term 1952-58. Some members did not complete the term in case of the resignation or death before the term ending in 1958. In such cases the bye-elections were held.

State - Member - Party

Bye-elections
The following bye elections were held in the year 1952.

References

1952 elections in India
1952